Thomas Trenchard (1672–1703), of Wolveton, Charminster, Dorset, was an English politician.

He was a Member (MP) of the Parliament of England for Dorchester in 1689, 17 December 1690 and February 1701. He represented Wareham in 1695 and 1698, and Dorset in December 1701.

References

1672 births
1703 deaths
English MPs 1689–1690
Politicians from Dorset
English MPs 1701
Members of the Parliament of England for Dorchester
English MPs 1695–1698
English MPs 1701–1702